Conrad Peutinger (14 October 1465 – 28 December 1547) was a German humanist, jurist, diplomat, politician, economist and archaeologist (serving as Emperor Maximilian I's chief archaeological adviser). A senior official in the municipal government of the Imperial City of Augsburg, he served as a counselor to Emperor Maximilian I and his successor Charles V. Also known as a passionate antiquarian, he collected, with the help of his wife Margareta Welser (1481–1552), one of the largest private libraries north of the Alps.

Life
He was born in Augsburg, the son of a reputable merchant family. He studied law at the universities of Padua and Bologna in Italy, where he obtained his doctorate and came in close touch with the humanism movement. Back in Germany, he was elected syndic of his hometown Augsburg and from 1497 held the office of a town clerk (Stadtschreiber), representing the city in several Imperial diets, notably that of Worms including the hearing of Martin Luther in 1521. Peutinger's accounts were a valuable source for later historians like Theodor Kolde.

He was on close terms with the Habsburg emperor Maximilian I, who appointed him Imperial councilor. Peutinger, an early proponent of economic liberalism, mediated between the Imperial estates and the Augsburg Fugger and Welser families. He was able to assert his position under Maximilian's successor Emperor Charles V, however, his politics aiming at a balance of power were aborted by the advancing Reformation after the 1529 Protestation at Speyer. When in 1534 the citizens of Augsburg turned Protestant, he retired from public offices.

Work

Peutinger corresponded with notable contemporary humanist scholars like Erasmus of Rotterdam, Jacob Sturm von Sturmeck and Willibald Pirckheimer. During the global spread of the printing press he studied numerous classical philologic and legal works from Italy. In 1520 he was one of the first to publish Roman inscriptions (Inscriptiones Romanæ), a work that has been cited as the most notable of his writings on classical antiquities.

Peutinger's name is mainly associated with the famous Tabula Peutingeriana, a medieval copy of a late antique world map of Roman roads from the British Isles to India and Central Asia. It was discovered by the Viennese scholar Conrad Celtes, who in 1507 handed it over to Peutinger for publication. Parts of the map were not published until 1591 by the Antwerp-based publishing house of Jan Moretus and in 1598 by Peutinger's relative Marcus Welser and Abraham Ortelius. Rediscovered in 1714, it was archived at the Vienna Imperial Library and first published as a whole by Franz Christoph von Scheyb in 1753.

Peutinger also first printed the Getica of Jordanes and the Historia Langobardorum of Paulus Diaconus.

Notes

References

External links
https://www.livius.org/pen-pg/peutinger/map.html
Three unknown formulas of the humanist Konrad Peutinger on www.ncbi.nlm.nih.gov

Online Galleries, History of Science Collections, University of Oklahoma Libraries High resolution images of works by and/or portraits of Konrad Peutinger in .jpg and .tiff format.

1465 births
1547 deaths
Politicians from Augsburg
German antiquarians
German Renaissance humanists
German scholars
German male non-fiction writers
16th-century German writers
16th-century German male writers
Writers from Augsburg